The Not-Too-Late Show with Elmo is an American late-night talk show hosted by the Muppet character Elmo. It is a spin-off of Sesame Street and was developed exclusively for the HBO Max streaming service. The series, consisting of 13 episodes, debuted on HBO Max on May 27, 2020. The first three episodes were available at launch, after which new episodes were premiered weekly. Each episode runs for 15 minutes. In March 2021, the series was renewed for a second season which premiered on September 30, 2021, when the show moved to the service's Cartoonito section. However, in August 2022, the series was removed from HBO Max. Reruns began airing on PBS Kids on February 10, 2023.

Premise
The host of the late-night talk show series is the Muppet character Elmo. The American program's main curricular goals are centered around children's bedtime routines, of which each episode demonstrates a different aspect. The Israeli program focuses primarily on long-form, in-depth celebrity interviews, designed to help younger viewers connect with others on a deeper level.

Cast and characters

 Ryan Dillon as Elmo
 David Rudman as Cookie Monster, Baby Bear, Sully, Two-Headed Monster (right head)
 Jennifer Barnhart as Mama Bear, Zoe
 Peter Linz as Ernie, Herry Monster
 Eric Jacobson as Bert, Grover, Oscar the Grouch, Two-Headed Monster (left head)
 Carmen Osbahr as Rosita, Ovejita
 Leslie Carrara-Rudolph as Abby Cadabby
 Frankie Cordero as Rudy
 Stephanie D'Abruzzo as Prairie Dawn, Mae (Elmo's mom)
 Matt Vogel as Big Bird, Count von Count, Biff, Mr. Johnson
 Tyler Bunch as Louie (Elmo's dad)
 Martin P. Robinson as Telly Monster, Freddy (Rudy's dad)
 Pam Arciero
 John Kennedy

The Israeli version adds Moishe Oofnik, the Yiddish-influenced curmudgeon famous from Sesame Street's Israeli adaptations, as Elmo's sidekick.

Episodes

Season 1 (2020)

Season 2 (2021)

International broadcast
In Southeast Asia, the series is aired through HBO Go and episodes are released alongside their HBO Max releases in the United States. In Canada, the series premiered on Treehouse TV on September 5, 2020. In New Zealand, the series premiered on TVNZ OnDemand on January 8, 2021. The show began airing on Cartoon Network in the United States on January 28, 2022, under the Cartoonito brand. Reruns of the series began airing exclusively on the PBS Kids 24/7 channel on February 10, 2023.

Sesame Workshop announced the production of an Israeli adaptation of the series, titled The Talk Show with Elmo (תוכנית האירוח של אלמו), which is slated to premiere on Hop! Channel in October of the same year. 14 episodes have been produced.

Production
The pilot show was directed by Benjamin Lehmann and was produced in January 2019, and features special guest Kacey Musgraves performing "Rubber Duckie". Full production of the series took place in November and December 2019.

In addition to Musgraves, confirmed guests were Jimmy Fallon, the Jonas Brothers, John Oliver, an uncredited actor Victor Joel Ortiz portraying Batman, Jason Sudeikis, Kwame Alexander, Sara Bareilles, Miles Brown, Ciara, Andy Cohen, Dan + Shay, Josh Groban, Mykal-Michelle Harris, H.E.R., Hoda Kotb, Lil Nas X, Blake Lively, John Mulaney, Pentatonix, Ben Platt, Jonathan Van Ness, Olivia Wilde and Sofia Carson. On March 29, 2021, HBO Max renewed the series for a second season.

Reception
The Not-Too-Late Show with Elmo received positive reviews. Review aggregator Rotten Tomatoes gave the first season of the show an 81% "fresh" rating based on 16 reviews with an average rating of 7/10. The critical consensus is: "With great guests, fun games, and a lot of silly songs, The Not-Too-Late Show with Elmo is a fitting bedtime show for tots that parents may even enjoy as well". Metacritic, which assigns a weighted mean rating out of 100, assigned a rating score of 70 based on 8 critic reviews, meaning favorable reviews for the first season.

The show has been reviewed by The Hollywood Reporter, Variety, The Week, and Comic Book Resources among others.

Accolades

References
  Some content in this article was copied from the Muppet Wiki, which is licensed under the Creative Commons Attribution-Share Alike 3.0 (Unported) (CC-BY-SA 3.0) license.

External links
The Not-Too-Late Show with Elmo at Sesame Workshop
The Not-Too-Late Show with Elmo on HBO Max (archived)
 
 

2020 American television series debuts
2021 American television series endings
2020s American children's comedy television series
2020s American late-night television series
2020s American satirical television series
2020s American sketch comedy television series
2020s preschool education television series
American preschool education television series
American television spin-offs
American television shows featuring puppetry
American television series with live action and animation
Children's sketch comedy
Early childhood education
Early childhood education in the United States
English-language television shows
Television series about children
Television series about monsters
Personal development television series
Sesame Street
Television series by Sesame Workshop
HBO Max original programming
Cartoon Network original programming
Cartoonito original programming